Jens Keukeleire (born 23 November 1988) is a Belgian professional road racing cyclist, who currently rides for UCI WorldTeam .

Major results

2009
 3rd Circuit de Wallonie
 4th Road race, UEC European Road Championships
 6th Kattekoers
 7th Memorial Van Coningsloo
2010
 1st  Overall Driedaagse van West-Vlaanderen
1st  Points classification
1st  Young rider classification
1st Stage 1
 1st Le Samyn
 1st Nokere Koerse
 5th Trofeo Magalluf–Palmanova
 5th Paris–Brussels
 6th Trofeo Cala Millor
2011
 1st Stage 3 Tour of Austria
 4th Nokere Koerse
 9th Overall Tour of Belgium
2012
 1st Stage 2 (TTT) Eneco Tour
 9th Paris–Tours
 10th Dwars door Vlaanderen
 10th Binche–Tournai–Binche
2013
 Vuelta a Burgos
1st Stages 2 & 3
 7th Dwars door Vlaanderen
2014
 6th Overall Tour de l'Eurométropole
 7th Gran Premio Città di Camaiore
 8th Overall Eneco Tour
 9th Dwars door Vlaanderen
2015
 6th Paris–Roubaix
 9th E3 Harelbeke
2016
 1st Stage 12 Vuelta a España
 1st Stage 1 Tour of Slovenia
 2nd Halle–Ingooigem
 3rd Gran Premio Bruno Beghelli
 5th Dwars door Vlaanderen
 7th Tre Valli Varesine
2017
 1st  Overall Tour of Belgium
 2nd Gent–Wevelgem
 4th Road race, National Road Championships
 5th Bruges Cycling Classic
  Combativity award Stage 19 Tour de France
2018
 1st  Overall Tour of Belgium
 4th Omloop van het Houtland
 10th Famenne Ardenne Classic
2019
 3rd Overall Four Days of Dunkirk
 5th Binche–Chimay–Binche
 5th Omloop van het Houtland
 7th Overall Deutschland Tour
 7th Kuurne–Brussels–Kuurne
2020
 4th Cadel Evans Great Ocean Road Race

Grand Tour results timeline

References

External links

 Wielernieuws.be

Belgian male cyclists
Living people
1988 births
Sportspeople from Bruges
Cyclists from West Flanders
Belgian Vuelta a España stage winners
European Games competitors for Belgium
Cyclists at the 2015 European Games